Chasing The Devil may refer to:

Movies 
 Chasing the Devil (2014)
 Director: Mark Haber
 Genre: Horror
 Starring: Challen Cates, Chris Devlin, Vivan Dugré, Elise Eberle, David Goldman, Ary Katz, Cory Knauf, Tim Phillipps, Stephan Smith Collins, Chris Yule
 Description: Patrick McCord doesn't accept the explanation of his sister's mysterious death as suicide, and instead teams up with a team of paranormal investigators to delve deeper into the inexplicable circumstances that surround what he believes to be murder. The team's investigation leads them from one bizarre and frightening clue to another, at the center of which seems to exist something evil and terrifying, a presence well beyond their wildest imaginations and experiences.

Books
Chasing the Devil Tim Butcher 2010
"Chasing the Devil: My Twenty-Year Quest to Capture the Green River Killer." Dave Reichert 1997

Music

Albums
Chasing the Devil: Temptation, studio album by Krayzie Bone 2015
Chasing the Devil Tom Rigney 1997

Songs
"Chasing the Devil" by Rick Wakeman Composed by Rick Wakeman
"Chasing the Devil" by Tom Rigney Composed by Tom Rigney
"Chasing the Devil" by Concerto Moon Composed by Norifumi Shima